Hotel Nacional is the eleventh studio album by Bosnian singer-songwriter Dino Merlin. It was released on 20 June 2014 by Dino Merlin's independent label Magaza and Croatia Records as the follow up to his 10th studio album Ispočetka (2008).  Production of the album was led by Dino himself alongside Yoad Nevo, Richard Niles, Baby Dooks, Marcos Ubeda, Gunnar Norden and longtime collaborators Mahir Sarihodžić and Mahir Beathouse.

Upon release the album debuted at number 8 on the Billboard World Albums Chart making it the only album of its kinds to be featured on this list from the region. The subsequent Hotel Nacional World Tour attracted more than 750,000 people during four years of running, an unprecedent feat in the touring industry of south-east Europe.

Background 

After completing the tour Ispočetka promoting his 10th studio album of the same name which sold over 700.000 tickets during the course of 4 years, Dino Merlin took a break from music and performing. The hiatus lasted for around 18 months during which most of the recording for the new album took place.

In several interviews Dino described his songwriting process as being "organic" meaning that Dino, unlike many others, never consciously starts writing a song, instead he waits for "the song to come to him". Hence, the time it takes for Dino to finish a song takes considerably longer in comparison to other songwriters. In some cases, as in the songs Ispočetka and Hotel Nacional, it took Dino years to finally finish them. The amount of time it takes for Dino's songs to come to fruition was evident with Hotel Nacional as it took almost 6 years to write all the songs for the album.

On 16 June 2011 Dino Merlin released the single Undo. The song marked a turning point in Dino's artistic expression. Critics as well as the audience remarked that the song was unlike any other Dino Merlin produced during his career as it featured a very modern arrangement, with electronic, alternative rock and dubstep elements. The song was later included in the album. Because it was released before the other singles and because it also reliably represented the new sound of the upcoming album, Undo served as the album's de facto first unofficial single.

Recording

Sarajevo 
Recording of the album took place in Dino's studio in his hometown of Sarajevo in the neighborhood of Ilidža with his longtime collaborators Mahir Beathouse and Mahir Sarihodžić. In Sarajevo, most of the demo tracks and the album's initial sound was created during the period of two years. Sessions occurred irregularly, which was in line with Dino's timing of songwriting, with some sessions lasting up to a couple of weeks and then followed by a hiatus of several months.

Zagreb 
Beside his collaborators in Sarajevo, Dino Merlin also spent a great deal of time in Zagreb operating from his apartment at park Zrinjevac. The opening single of Ispočetka, the song Dabogda was produced by DJ and music producer David Vurdelja aka Baby Dooks whom Dino met at a late night studio session while wrapping up the album in 2008. The song in collaboration with Hari Mata Hari, a well known regional singer, ended up hitting the charts and becoming the biggest hit of the year in the region. Dabogda was the only song Dino Merlin worked on with Baby Dooks during the recording of album Ispočetka. Their collaboration continued and resulted in producing the first major single from Hotel Nacional and probably the biggest hit on the record Školjka.

London 
During early 2011 Dino took a trip to London to meet his friend and music producer Srdjan Kurpjel with whom he collaborated on both Burek and Ispočetka. Kurpjel introduced him to fellow London based producer Yoad Nevo who at the time worked with some of the most iconic British acts to date - Pet Shop Boys, Sugababes, Sophie Ellis-Bextor etc. Yoad Nevo while firstly recruited to produce Dino's Eurovision Song Contest entry Love in Rewind, was later involved in additional and post-production of almost all of the songs and is credited for mixing end engineering the sound for Hotel Nacional. As a result, the album Hotel Nacional is widely recognized among peers and critics to be possibly the best sound engineered album from the region in recent memory.

Stockholm 

During the previous tour Ispočetka, Dino participated in the Eurovision Song Contest in Düsseldorf performing the song "Love in rewind" in early 2011. During rehearsals he befriended the Swedish delegation and the producer of the winning song of Eurovison Song Contest held in 1999 in Jerusalem, Take me to your heaven - Marcos Ubeda.  Marcos, later contributed to producing the single Hotel Nacional after which the album was named in 2014. Later during the year, Dino was also introduced to famed jazz producer Gunnar Norden, who recorded and produced the third single of the album "Sunce".

Release 

During the spring of 2014 heavy flooding hit the region with Dino's home country being hit the most. Tens of thousands of people were affected and thousands of homes were destroyed. In order to raise awareness and aid money, Dino Merlin partnered with the Red Cross of Bosnia and Herzegovina, Croatia and Serbia to publish the song . The video featured footage from the effects of flooding and its disastrous consequences while featuring Red Cross telephone numbers on which money could be donated. Apart from releasing the song Ruža, Dino Merlin was actively involved in alleviating the pain caused by the disasters by visiting the affected sites by flooding as well as donating to the affected population in both Bosnia and Serbia. The natural disasters that affected the region postponed the launch of the album which was planned in early May 2014.

In June 2014 a campaign promoting the new album was slowly taking place. On 15 June 2014 the single Školjka was published worldwide during the halftime of Bosnia's first ever football world cup performance. The song was released on YouTube, iTunes and Deezer and recorded over 100,000 YouTube views during the first 24 hours upon release. The song rose quickly to popularity and was featured in almost every halftime commercial break on national television during the world cup.

Just days later, on 19 June 2014, Dino Merlin released a photo on his Facebook profile of him holding the cover of the album Hotel Nacional. The cover featured an inverted photo of Dino Merlin looking back at his childhood neighborhood of Alifakovac in Sarajevo. The following day, 20 June 2014, the album was released to iTunes, Amazon and Deezer and was distributed in hard copy across the region. Accompanying the launch of the album, a renewed official website was launched, as well as a nationwide promotional campaign with billboards set all across the country. In neighboring Croatia, the album was published by the nation's biggest record label - Croatia Records. In Serbia, the sale of the album was upheld due to legal issues with the partnering record label City Records. Due to successful sales in its first week after release, the album debuted at number 8 on the Billboard World Albums list. Hotel Nacional is the first and only album from the region to be included in such a list. In this regard it represented a monumental success in Dino's career.

Track listing

References

Dino Merlin albums
2014 albums